Joel Harold Bolger (born February 16, 1955, in Carroll, Iowa) is an American lawyer and jurist.  He served as a justice of the Alaska Supreme Court from 2013 to 2021. He served as chief justice from 2018 to 2021. He was a judge of the Alaska Court of Appeals (Alaska's intermediate appellate court) from October 2008 until his appointment to the high court.  Prior to that, he worked as a lawyer throughout Alaska since arriving there in the late 1970s.  He also served as a state trial court judge in Kodiak and Valdez. On November 30, 2020, Bolger announced his plans to retire effective June 30, 2021.

References

External links

|-

1955 births
Living people
20th-century American lawyers
21st-century American judges
Alaska state court judges
Chief Justices of the Alaska Supreme Court
Justices of the Alaska Supreme Court
People from Carroll, Iowa
People from Kodiak, Alaska
People from Valdez, Alaska
University of Iowa College of Law alumni